The Lancashire Division, Royal Artillery, was an administrative grouping of garrison units of the Royal Artillery, Artillery Militia and Artillery Volunteers within the British Army's Northern District from 1882 to 1889.

Organisation
Under General Order 72 of 4 April 1882 the Royal Artillery (RA) broke up its existing administrative brigades of garrison artillery (7th–11th Brigades, RA) and assigned the individual batteries to 11 new territorial divisions. These divisions were purely administrative and recruiting organisations, not field formations. Most were formed within the existing military districts into which the United Kingdom was divided, and for the first time associated the part-time Artillery Militia with the regulars. Shortly afterwards the Artillery Volunteers were also added to the territorial divisions. The Regular Army batteries were grouped into one brigade, usually of nine sequentially-numbered batteries and a depot battery. For these units the divisions represented recruiting districts – batteries could be serving anywhere in the British Empire and their only connection to brigade headquarters (HQ) was for the supply of drafts and recruits. The artillery militia units (sometimes referred to as regiments) already comprised a number of batteries, and were redesignated as brigades, losing their county titles in the process. The artillery volunteers, which had previously consisted of numerous independent Artillery Volunteer Corps (AVC) of various sizes, sometimes grouped into administrative brigades, had been consolidated into larger AVCs in 1881, which were now affiliated to the appropriate territorial division.

Composition
Lancashire Division, RA, listed second in order of precedence, was organised within Northern District with the following composition:

 Headquarters (HQ) at Liverpool
 1st Brigade
 HQ at Liverpool
 1st Bty at Hong Kong – formerly 9th Bty, 10th Bde
 2nd Bty at Jersey – formerly 11th Bty, 10th Bde
 3rd Bty at Royal Artillery Barracks, Woolwich – formerly 4th Bty, 7th Bde
 4th Bty at Ferozepore – formerly 3rd Bty, 9th Bde
 5th Bty at Lahore – formerly 9th Bty, 11th Bde
 6th Bty at Gibraltar – formerly 3rd Bty, 10th Bde
 7th Bty at Gibraltar – formerly 16th Bty, 10th Bde
 8th Bty at Gibraltar – formerly 17th Bty, 10th Bde
 9th Bty – new Bty formed 1885
 10th Bty – new Bty formed 1887
 Depot Bty at Liverpool – formerly Depot Bty, 5th Bde
 2nd Brigade at Liverpool – formerly Royal Lancashire Militia Artillery (6 btys)
 1st Lancashire Artillery Volunteers at Liverpool
 2nd Lancashire Artillery Volunteers at Liverpool
 3rd Lancashire Artillery Volunteers at Blackburn
 4th Lancashire Artillery Volunteers at Liverpool
 5th Lancashire Artillery Volunteers at Preston
 6th Lancashire Artillery Volunteers at Liverpool
 7th Lancashire (The Manchester Artillery) Artillery Volunteers at Manchester
 8th Lancashire Artillery Volunteers at Liverpool
 9th Lancashire Artillery Volunteers at Bolton – new unit formed 1889
 1st Cheshire and Carnarvonshire Artillery Volunteers at Chester
 1st Shropshire and Staffordshire Artillery Volunteers at Etruria

Disbandment
In 1889 the garrison artillery was reorganised again into three large divisions of garrison artillery and one of mountain artillery. Although the names of the garrison divisions were still territorial (Eastern, Southern and Western) the assignment of units to them was geographically arbitrary, with the militia and volunteer units formerly in Lancashire Division being grouped in the Southern Division, while the regular batteries were distributed across Southern and Eastern divisions (where there were the most coast defences to be manned in time of war) and completely renumbered.

See also
 Royal Garrison Artillery
 List of Royal Artillery Divisions 1882–1902
 Eastern Division, Royal Artillery
 Southern Division, Royal Artillery

Footnotes

Notes

References
 J.B.M. Frederick, Lineage Book of British Land Forces 1660–1978, Vol II, Wakefield: Microform Academic, 1984, ISBN 1-85117-009-X.
 Lt-Gen H.G. Hart, The New Annual Army List, Militia List, Yeomanry Cavalry List and Indian Civil Service List for 1884, London: John Murray, 1883.
 Lt-Gen H.G. Hart, The New Annual Army List, Militia List, Yeomanry Cavalry List and Indian Civil Service List for 1890, London: John Murray, 1889.
 Lt-Col M.E.S. Lawes, Battery Records of the Royal Artillery, 1859–1877, Woolwich: Royal Artillery Institution, 1970.
 Norman E.H. Litchfield, The Militia Artillery 1852–1909 (Their Lineage, Uniforms and Badges), Nottingham: Sherwood Press, 1987, ISBN 0-9508205-1-2.
 Norman Litchfield & Ray Westlake, The Volunteer Artillery 1859–1908 (Their Lineage, Uniforms and Badges), Nottingham: Sherwood Press, 1982, ISBN 0-9508205-0-4.
 Col K. W. Maurice-Jones, The History of Coast Artillery in the British Army, London: Royal Artillery Institution, 1959/Uckfield: Naval & Military Press, 2005, ISBN 978-1-845740-31-3.
 War Office, Monthly Army List, London: HM Stationery Office, 1882–89.

Royal Artillery divisions
Military units and formations in Lancashire
Military units and formations in Liverpool
Military units and formations established in 1882
Military units and formations disestablished in 1889